Le Markstein is a winter sports station in the Vosges mountains in France situated at an altitude of between  and  which is located on the Route des Crêtes. It forms a set of cross-country skiing with the Breitfirst ski-station and the Grand Ballon. The highest point is the summit of the Jungfraukopf. The station staged World Cup skiing in 1983 and 1987 and World Cup Paragliding in 1999. The roads through the station are also used from time to time by the Tour de France cycle race, including twice in 2014.

Geography

Climate
Le Markstein has a humid continental climate (Köppen climate classification Dfb) closely bordering on a subarctic climate (Dfc).

Skiing
The Markstein ski station has eight ski lifts.

Tracks
The station has 12 tracks in all including:
4 green runs
4 blue runs
2 red runs
2 black runs

Cycle racing
Prior to 2014, the Tour de France cycle race passed through Le Markstein seven times either during the passage over the Col du Grand Ballon or in the descent from the Col du Platzerwasel, although it was not categorized for the Mountains classification. The first passage was in 1969 and the most recent in 2009.

Details of the climbs

2014 Tour de France
In 2014, the Tour de France passed through Le Markstein twice. The race then travelled via the Route des Crêtes (D431) before crossing the Col du Grand Ballon and descending to the finish at Mulhouse. The leader over the summit was the German rider Tony Martin.

The following day, the tour again passed through the station, as it descended from the Col du Platzerwasel towards Oderen.

References

Ski stations in France
Tourist attractions in Haut-Rhin
Mountain passes of the Vosges
Skiing in the Vosges
Sports venues in Haut-Rhin